Singapore participated in the 2002 Asian Games held in Busan, South Korea, from September 29 to October 14, 2002. Athletes from Singapore won overall 17 medals (including five golds), and clinched 13th spot in the medal table.

Medalists

References

Nations at the 2002 Asian Games
2002
Asian Games